The 1949 World Table Tennis Championships – Swaythling Cup (men's team) was the 16th edition of the men's team championship.  

Hungary won the gold medal defeating Czechoslovakia 5–4 in the final. England and the United States both won bronze medals by virtue of finishing second in their groups.

Medalists

Team

Swaythling Cup tables

Group 1

+ Poland and Egypt both withdrew from Group 1

Group 2

Final

See also
 List of World Table Tennis Championships medalists

References

-